The Redpath Museum is a museum of natural history belonging to McGill University and located on the university's campus at 859, rue Sherbrooke Ouest (859 Sherbrooke Street West) in Montreal, Quebec. It was built in 1882 as a gift from the sugar baron Peter Redpath.

It houses collections of interest to ethnology, biology, paleontology, and mineralogy/geology. The collections were started by some of the same individuals who founded the Smithsonian and Royal Ontario Museum collections. The current director is Hans Larsson. Commissioned by Redpath to mark the 25th anniversary of Sir John William Dawson's appointment as Principal, the Museum was designed by A.C. Hutchison and A.D. Steele. McGill University's Redpath Museum website characterizes it as an "idiosyncratic expression of eclectic Victorian Classicism" as well as "an unusual and late example of the Greek Revival in North America."

It is the oldest building built specifically to be a museum in Canada. Both the museum's interior and exterior have been utilized as a set, for movies and commercials.

Collections

Geology (mineralogy)
Five collections, containing approximately 16,000 specimens from all over the world, are identified by their initial letters:
'D' Doell collection for Dr Donald Doell, a physician who contributed many of the more recent materials in the collection.
'F' Ferrier collection for Walter Frederick Ferrier, famous mining engineer who contributed this pre-eminent collection of minerals from many classic locations.
'J' Jeffrey collection for Jeffrey de Fourestier, mineralogist and former volunteer at the museum.
'P' Palache collection for Charles Palache, mineralogist and Harvard professor.
'SC' Shirley Collection for the wife of Sir Hugh Graham, 1st Baron Atholstan who donated the collection in the early 1880s.
'NS' New System collection for the general collection catalogue. This collection contains the main body of specimens including the collection of the former Natural History Society of Montreal and specimens from the collection of Lord Strathcona.

Entomology
The Lyman entomology collections were transferred in 1961 by D. Keith McE. Kevan to Macdonald Campus in Sainte Anne-de-Bellevue, leading to the creation of the Lyman Entomological Museum and Research Laboratory.

Paleontology
The museum's important collection of fossils owes much of its beginning to Sir William Dawson who provided not only many of the fossils of plants from his native Nova Scotia, but procured many important specimens from around the world.
Dr Thomas Clark, for many years up until his death, was a fixture at the museum and was renowned for his pioneering work on fossils from the Burgess Shale, some of the oldest known anywhere.

Ethnology
The ethnological and archeological collection is one of the oldest in North America and began with Sir William Dawson's collection. It received further material from the Natural History Society of Montreal. It now has over 17,000 items from Africa, ancient Egypt, Oceania, paleolithic Europe and South America. The collection of First Nations artifacts that were once part of the collection now are housed in the nearby McCord Museum in Montreal.

Affiliations 
The Museum is affiliated with: CMA,  CHIN, and Virtual Museum of Canada.

Metro
The museum, accessible by walking from many downtown Montreal locations, is also near the McGill station on the Montreal Metro Green Line.

See also 
 Redpath Library
 George Barnston

References

External links 

 Redpath Museum
 Redpath Museum Biodiversity website
 Images
 Lyman Entomological Museum and Research Laboratory
 360 interactive panorama featuring the Albertosaurus in the Dawson gallery
Photograph:Redpath Museum, 1883 - McCord Museum
Photograph:Redpath Museum, 1913 - McCord Museum
Photograph:Interior of Redpath Museum, about 1893 - McCord Museum

McGill University buildings
Museums in Montreal
Natural history museums in Canada
Cultural infrastructure completed in 1882
Museums established in 1882
Egyptological collections in Canada
Redpath family
University museums in Canada
Greek Revival architecture in Canada
First Nations museums in Canada